Wilella Louise Waldorf (November 22, 1899 – March 12, 1946) was an American drama critic and newspaper editor.

Early life 
Wilella Louise Waldorf was born and raised in South Bend, Indiana, the daughter of John Maurice Waldorf and Carrie Throckmorton Waldorf. She graduated from high school in 1918, and from Mount Holyoke College in 1922.

Career 
As a young woman, Waldorf worked as an investigator for a law firm, a clerk for Western Union, and editor of a historical encyclopedia. She joined the staff of the New York Post in 1925; she was film critic from 1926, drama editor from 1928 to 1946, and drama critic from 1941 to 1946, replacing John Mason Brown. She was one of the first women to hold an editorial position at the Post, and the only woman drama critic at a New York daily newspaper. She was elected to the New York Drama Critics Circle in 1941, and served as the group's treasurer in her last years. Her last review, of a revival of Show Boat, was published in January 1946. Vernon Rice succeeded her at the Post.

Waldorf's negative reviews were characterized by blunt judgment, pronouncing The Time, the Place and the Girl (1942) "an embarrassing bore", and Hairpin Harmony (1943) as "doggedly amateurish". She is sometimes credited with the phrase "We can always call them Bulgarians," in reference to stage characters written or played as gay or lesbian. She quoted film producer Samuel Goldwyn as using the line.

Personal life 
She died in 1946, aged 46 years, at her home in New York City, after several months of illness.

References

External links 

 Dorothy Chansky (September 2018), "Lone Body/Lone Voice: Historicizing Critic Wilella Waldorf", a recent manuscript on Waldorf

1899 births
1946 deaths
People from South Bend, Indiana
Mount Holyoke College alumni
American film critics
American women film critics
American theater critics
Women theatre critics
American newspaper editors
Women newspaper editors